Super Baseball Simulator 1.000 is a 1991  traditional baseball simulation video game by Culture Brain for the Super NES that is the sequel to the NES game Baseball Simulator 1.000. This game is called  in Japan.

In the game, there are three leagues: Atlantic, Northern, and Ultra. Each league has six teams. In the Ultra League, pitchers and batters have special power-ups that boost their abilities which gives the game a surrealistic feel that is rare in the sports genre. Players can even create their own baseball teams and assign special moves to the players that they name themselves. The game can be played in exhibition mode and season mode.

In May 2021, Super Baseball Simulator 1.000 was added to the Nintendo Switch Online classic games service.

Baseball Simulator series
These Baseball titles included some form of "Super League" where pitchers and batters would have special abilities.

 Baseball Simulator 1.000 (1989, NES), also known as Choujin Ultra Baseball
 Super Baseball Simulator 1.000 (1991, Super NES), also known as Super Ultra Baseball
 Ultra Baseball Jitsumeiban (1992, SNES) NPB licensed.
 Super Ultra Baseball 2 (1994, SNES)
 Ultra Baseball Jitsumeiban 2 (1994, SNES) NPB licensed.
 Ultra Baseball Jitsumeiban 3 (1995, SNES) NPB licensed.

References

External links

1991 video games
Baseball Simulator 1.000
Culture Brain games
Nintendo Switch Online games
Super Nintendo Entertainment System games
Video game sequels
Multiplayer and single-player video games
Video games developed in Japan